Hilda Fanny Dianda (born 13 April 1925) is an Argentinian composer, musicologist, music educator, and conductor.

Early life 
Hilda Dianda was born in Córdoba, Argentina. She began her musical studies in Buenos Aires from 1942-1950 under Honorio Siccardi. She was awarded a fellowship, and began studying conducting under Hermann Scherchen in Venice from 1949-1950. She later moved to France where she was influenced by the "Musical Research Group" (GRMC) of French radio, directed by Pierre Schaeffer. She was invited into a phonology research position with Radio Audizioni Italiane (RAI) along with John Cage, Henri Pousseur, Dieter Schönbach, and André Boucourechliev, where she also began to study electronic music in the Studio di Fonologia, Milan. These studies earned her a fellowship and a Medal of Cultural Merit from the Kranichstein Music Institute. From 1960 to 1962 she participated in the International Courses of New Music in Darmstadt, Germany.

Career 
In 1966 she worked in the Electronic Music Lab at the California State University, Northridge in the United States. From 1967 to 1971 she returned to Argentina as a professor of composition, orchestration, technical, and orchestral conducting at the School of Arts of the Universidad Nacional de Córdoba, Argentina after which she moved to Germany until 1976. She toured Latin America and Europe as a conductor. As a musicologist, Dianda published professional articles on contemporary music in a number of journals and magazines as well as her book La Música Argentina de Hoy in 1966. After a seven year break from composing, Dianda wrote The Requiem in 1984 dedicated to "our dead" and utilizing ancient Latin texts.

Honors and awards
1964 Medal of Cultural Merit, Italy
1980 Caballero en la Orden de las Palmas Académicas, France
Official Recognition by Fundatión Alicia Moreau de Justo, Argentina

Works
Dianda composes for orchestra, chamber ensemble and electronic production. Selected works include:

References

1925 births
Living people
20th-century classical composers
Argentine music educators
Argentine women educators
Women classical composers
Argentine classical composers
People from Córdoba, Argentina
Women music educators
20th-century women composers
Argentine women composers